Jersey Community High School is a public high school in Jerseyville, Illinois. It is part of the Jersey Community Unit School District 100. Jersey Community High School has an enrollment of approximately 1,100 students and currently employs 96 teachers and staff members.

History
The present high school building was built during the 2005 school year on an adjacent site. The new facility was opened on January 17, 2006 when the students returned after an extended winter break.

Athletics
Jersey Community High School is a part of the Illinois High School Association, and plays in the Mississippi Valley Conference league. Its athletics director is currently Rob Steinkuehler.

The school has the following athletic programs:

Male athletics

Baseball
Basketball
Bowling
Cross country
Football
Golf
Hockey
Soccer
Tennis
Track
Wrestling

Female athletics

Basketball
Bowling
Cross country
Golf
Softball
Soccer
Tennis
Track
Volleyball
Wrestling

Clubs and organizations
The school has the following organizations:

Alternative Fiction Club
Art Club
Audio Visual/Communications Club
Cheerleading
Class Council
Concert band
Cooperative Education
Future Farmers of America
French / German Club
Illinois Career Association
Illinois Youth Council
Improv Actors
International Thespian Society
Jazz band
Jazz Ensemble
JILG (Jobs For Illinois Graduates)
ITICAT (Alcohol and Drug Community Prevention)
Key Club (Kiwanis-sponsored community service)
Marching band
Model United Nations
Olympiad Math Contest
Panther Chess Club
PC Wet (Piasa Creek Watershed Education Team)
Poms/Dance Team
Rifle / Drill Team
Scholastic Bowl
Shades of Blue
Show Choir
Spanish Club
Student Council
Symphonic Band
Talent Search
TATU (Teens Against Tobacco Use)
WYSE (Worldwide Youth in Science and Engineering)
Yearbook Committee

Notable alumni
 Brent Hawkins - professional football player for the Saskatchewan Roughriders of the CFL, and formerly for the Jacksonville Jaguars of the NFL
 Jana Shortal - Television news reporter in Minneapolis, Minnesota for KARE.
  Billy Hurst - Nashville recording artist, St. Louis sports photographer, class of 1992 25-year homecoming representative.
 Victor Ojeda - television reporter at KPLR-TV in St. Louis, Mo.
Terry Shepard - Assistant Foreign News Editor, Sunday News Editor, Los Angeles Times; Deputy Associate Chancellor for Public Affairs, University of Illinois; Director of University Communications, Stanford University; Vice President for Public Affairs, Rice University.

References

External links
 Jersey Community High School website

Public high schools in Illinois
Jerseyville, Illinois
Schools in Jersey County, Illinois